The Wheel of Fortune: A Comedy is a comedy in five acts written by playwright Richard Cumberland and first presented at the Drury Lane Theatre in London on 28 February 1795, with a prologue and an epilogue.

John Philip Kemble was praised for his portrayal of the misanthropic, embittered Roderick Penruddock, who cannot forget but learns to forgive. The famous playwright August von Kotzebue claimed that the misanthropic character was stolen from his Menschenhass und Reue. Elizabeth Inchbald was in some measure of agreement with Kotzebue, but Cumberland objected. Weazel the lawyer was one of Richard Suett's best roles.

The play is mentioned in Jane Austen's 1814 novel Mansfield Park:

In December 1796 Ann Brunton Merry played the role of Emily Tempest at the Chestnut Street Theatre in Philadelphia.

Characters
 Sir David Daw — Wealthy man that Emily Tempest's father wants Emily to marry
 Tempest — Father of Emily Tempest
 Roderick Penruddock — An embittered former suitor of Arabella, who married Woodville
 Woodville — Husband of Arabella
 Sydenham — Friend of Woodville
 Henry Woodville — Son, and only child, from Arabella's marriage and love interest of Emily
 Timothy Weazel — Lawyer
 Attendant in the house of Woodville
 Jenkins — Butler in charge of the deceased Sir George Penruddock's servants
 Livery servant
 Servants of the deceased Sir George Penruddock
 Servant to Tempest
 Mrs. Woodville — Arabella, who married Woodville
 Emily Tempest — Love interest of Henry Woodville
 Dame Dunckley — Roderick Penruddock's elderly servant at his cottage
 Maid of the lodging

Plot summary
Roderick Penruddock's rural cottage is the location for the first act. The scenes of other four acts are in London. The comic lawyer Timothy Weazel finds Roderick Penruddock, who has been living for twenty years in isolated misanthropy, embittered against Arabella and his enemy Woodville. Weazel informs Penruddock that he is the heir of the deceased Sir George Penruddock, a cousin of Roderick. This unexpected inheritance and Woodville's ruin at the gaming tables create a possibility. Roderick plots his revenge and searches for his enemy Woodville in London, where he encounters Henry Woodville. Arabella and his enemy Woodville's friend Sydenham make appeals to Penruddock. The appeals and his own pangs of conscience cause Penruddock to repent, turn to forgiveness, abandon his plans for revenge, and bestow a fortune upon Henry Woodville and Emily.

References

Plays by Richard Cumberland
1795 plays
West End plays
Comedy plays